Esoteric Circle is the second album by Norwegian saxophonist Jan Garbarek, originally released under the band name "The Esoteric Circle" on Bob Thiele's Flying Dutchman label but re-issued under his name on the Freedom imprint, performed by Garbarek with Terje Rypdal, Arild Andersen and Jon Christensen.

Reception
The Allmusic review by Brian Olewnick awards the album 4 stars and states, "a highly successful and enjoyable effort, one that can stand comfortably with work being done at that time by Tony Williams or John McLaughlin... Garbarek's own playing, here entirely on tenor, come largely out of Albert Ayler as well as Coltrane, and his general attack is much more raw and aggressive than the style for which he would eventually become more widely known through his recordings for ECM".

Track listing
All compositions by Jan Garbarek.

 "Traneflight" – 2:51
 "Ralbalder" – 8:15
 "Esoteric Circle" – 5:22
 "Vips" – 5:40
 "Sas 644" – 8:49
 "Nefertite" – 2:05
 "Gee" – 1:10
 "Karin's Mode" – 7:30
 "Breeze Ending" – 3:39

Personnel
Jan Garbarek – tenor saxophone
Terje Rypdal – guitar
Arild Andersen – bass
Jon Christensen – percussion

References 

Jan Garbarek albums
1971 debut albums
Flying Dutchman Records albums
Freedom Records albums
Albums produced by George Russell (composer)